A pinwheel nebula is a nebulous region in the shape of a pinwheel.

Spiral galaxies

The term 'Pinwheel nebula' is an antiquated misnomer used by observers before Edwin Hubble realized that many of these spiral shaped nebulae were actually 'island universes' or what we now call galaxies.

Wolf–Rayet nebulae

Some Wolf–Rayet stars are surrounded by pinwheel nebulae. These nebulae are formed from the dust that is spewed out of a binary star system. The stellar winds of the two stars collide and form two dust lanes that spiral outward with the rotation of the system. An example of this is WR 104.

External links
"The Twisted Tale of Wolf-Rayet 104, First of the Pinwheel Nebulae" Some Wolf–Rayet stars in binaries are close enough that we can image a rotating "pinwheel nebula" showing the dust generated by colliding winds in the binary system, from aperture masking interferometry observations.
Pinwheel Galaxy from ESA/Hubble